The governor is the chief executive of the Mexican state of Baja California Sur.  The present governor is Víctor Manuel Castro Cosío of Morena, who took office on September 10, 2021.

Governors of Baja California Sur
Baja California Sur was admitted as a Mexican state on October 8, 1974. Félix Agramont Cota, the last governor of the outgoing territory, served as the first governor of Baja California Sur from the state's creation in October 1974 until April 1975. Angel César Mendoza Arámburo took office on April 6, 1975, as Baja California Sur's first elected governor.

Governors of the South Territory of Baja California
The South Territory of Baja California is the predecessor territory of Baja California Sur.

References

External links
 List of governors of Baja California Sur 

Baja California Sur